Jacques de Luxembourg, Seigneur de Richebourg (1426 – Nantes, 20 August 1487) was a French noble who served Charles the Bold, Duke of Burgundy and later King Louis XI of France.

Life 
Jacques was the third son of Peter I, Count of Saint-Pol and Margaret of Baux. He fought beside Arthur de Richemont, Constable of France, at Formigny.  He was knighted after the Battle of Gavere on 23 July 1453. In the following years, he served Charles the Bold, Duke of Burgundy as an army commander. In 1468 he was awarded the Order of the Golden Fleece. Supporting the Burgundians, Jacques was wounded and captured by the French near Arras. While convalescing in Paris, he agreed to serve Louis XI and was made chamberlain. He received the French Order of Saint Michael.

Jacques died in 1487 and was buried at the Cistercian abbey at Cercamp.

Marriage and issue
He married firstly Jeanne, comtesse de Sarrewerden and Moers, and secondly Isabelle de Roubaix (1415–1498), daughter of  Pierre de Roubaix. He had 2 sons, who died young and 3 daughters. 
He was succeeded by his daughter Isabelle de Luxembourg, who married Jean III de Melun (1460–1504).

References

Sources

Further reading
 Raphael de Smedt (Hrsg.): Les chevaliers de l’ordre de la Toison d’or au XVe siècle: notices bio-bibliographiques. Frankfurt 2000, S. 157–159 (Kieler Werkstücke. D 3).
Jacques Paviot, Jacques de Luxembourg. Politic et culture chez un grand seigneur du XVe siècle, in: D. Boutet u. J. Verger (Hrsg.), Penser le pouvoir au Moyen Age (VIIIe–XVe siècle). Études offertes à Françoise Autrand, Paris 2000, S. 327-341.

1426 births
1487 deaths
House of Luxembourg
15th-century French people
Knights of the Golden Fleece
Burgundian knights